Extreme Volume Live is the first live album by the American heavy metal band Racer X. It features solos from four members of the band. It was recorded at The Country Club in Reseda, California.

Track listing

Personnel
Racer X
Jeff Martin – vocals
Paul Gilbert – lead guitar and rhythm guitar
Bruce Bouillet – lead guitar and rhythm guitar
John Alderete – bass guitar
Scott Travis – drums

Production
Ron Bloom, Ricky Delena –producers, engineers
Judd Levison – production management, assistant engineer (TMF Communications, Toluca Lake, CA)
Steve Fontano – additional production with Racer X, mixing at Prairie Sun Recording Studios in Cotati, California
George Horn – mastering at Fantasy Studios, Berkeley, California
Mike Varney – executive producer

References

External links
 Official Racer X website

Racer X (band) albums
1988 live albums
Shrapnel Records albums